The U1A polyadenylation inhibition element (PIE) is an RNA element  which is responsible for the regulation of the length of the polyA tail of the U1A protein pre-mRNA. The PIE is located in the U1A mRNA 3' UTR. PIE adopts a U-shaped structure, with binding sites for a single U1A protein at each bend and when complexed with the two proteins it blocks activity of poly(A) polymerase (PAP), and inhibits its activity.

References

External links 
 

Cis-regulatory RNA elements